Rabaki Jérémie Ouédraogo (born 1 January 1973) is a professional road racing cyclist from Burkina Faso. He is the 2005–06 UCI Africa Tour season champion and the overall winner at the 2005 Tour du Faso. He was one of three riders to represent his nation at the 2006 UCI Road World Championships Road Race.

Major results
Source:

2004
 4th, Overall, Tour du Faso
2005
  National Cycling Championship Road Race
 1st, Overall, Tour du Faso
 1st, Stage 1
 1st, Stage 8
2006
 2005-2006 Champion, UCI Africa Tour
  National Cycling Championship Road Race
 1st, Overall, Boucle du Coton
 1st, Stage 1
 1st, Stage 7
 Rider, UCI Road World Championships Road Race

References

1973 births
Living people
Burkinabé male cyclists
Place of birth missing (living people)
21st-century Burkinabé people